Tuff Enuff Records was a British queer/riot grrrl record label based in Brighton, England.

History
Tuff Enuff was established in 2012 as a spin-off from associated club night Riots Not Diets, and specialises in releasing DIY punk and lo-fi/underground music. The label is considered to be in the tradition of Slampt Records as well as more recent British queercore labels such as Homocrime and Irrk.
 
First release was compilation album Why Diet When You Could Riot?, which was favourably reviewed in Maximum Rocknroll and elsewhere and included tracks from Ste McCabe and Trash Kit. Two further compilations followed, 2013's Carry On Rioting and 2014's I Know Why the Caged Grrrl Sings, including tracks by Shrag and Shopping, respectively.

The label released a series of well-received cassette EPs by bands such as Frau, No Ditching, Dog Legs, The Ethical Debating Society and Big Joanie; vinyl singles by Men Oh Pause and Slum Of Legs; as well as vinyl albums by Roseanne Barrr, Daskinsey4 and Ye Nuns, the latter band featuring Debbie Smith, Charley Stone and former members of Mambo Taxi and thee Headcoatees playing covers of songs by The Monks.

Artists
 Alison’s Birthday
 As Ondas
 Big Joanie
 Crumbs
 Daskinsey4
 Dog Legs
 The Ethical Debating Society
 Frau
 Grubs
 King Alfred, Man Of Leisure
 Martha
 Men Oh Pause
 The Middle Ones
 Milky Wimpshake
 Molar
 Neurotic Fiction
 No Ditching
 Roseanne Barr
 Slum Of Legs
 Try The Pie
 Two White Cranes
 Ye Nuns

References

External links
Tuff Enuff Discogs
Tuff Enuff 45Cat
Tuff Enuff Bandcamp

Underground punk scene in the United Kingdom
British independent record labels
Record labels established in 2012
Punk record labels
Riot grrrl
Queercore